The SIPA S.70 was a late 1940s French eight-passenger light transport aircraft prototype built by Société Industrielle Pour l’Aéronautique (SIPA).

Design and development
The design for a commercial light transport for inter-city routes was started in 1947, the S.70 was a wooden, twin-engined, low-wing cantilever, cabin monoplane with a twin tail. Powered by two  Mathis G.8R piston engines it had room for six to eight passengers with a pilot sat centrally at the front. The prototype, registered F-WZCI, was flown in 1949 but very little else is known and it did not enter production.

Specification

See also

References

Notes

1940s French civil utility aircraft
S0070
Low-wing aircraft
Aircraft first flown in 1949
Twin piston-engined tractor aircraft